Captain Frederic John Walker,  (3 June 1896 – 9 July 1944) (his first name is given as Frederick in the Oxford Dictionary of National Biography and some London Gazette entries) was a Royal Navy officer noted for his exploits during the Second World War. Walker was the most successful anti-submarine warfare commander during the Battle of the Atlantic and was known more popularly as Johnnie Walker (for the Johnnie Walker brand of whisky).

Early life and career
Walker was born in Plymouth, the son of Frederic Murray and Lucy Selina (née Scriven) Walker. He joined the Royal Navy as a cadet in 1909 and was educated at the Royal Naval Colleges at Osborne and Dartmouth, where he excelled. Following the end of the First World War, Walker joined the  battleship . He married Jessica Eileen Ryder Stobart, with whom he had three sons and a daughter.

Interwar period, 1920s–1930s
During the interwar period Walker entered the field of anti-submarine warfare. He took a course at the newly founded anti-submarine warfare training school of HMS Osprey, on the Isle of Portland, which was established in 1924. Walker consequently became an expert in this particular type of warfare, and was appointed to a post specialising in this field, serving on a number of capital ships. In May 1933 he was promoted to commander and took charge of the First World War destroyer . In December 1933 Walker took command of the  sloop Falmouth based on the China Station. In April 1937 Walker became the Experimental Commander at HMS Osprey.

Second World War 
When the Second World War began, in 1939, Walker's career seemed at an end. Still a commander, he had been passed over for promotion to captain and indeed had been scheduled for early retirement. He gained a reprieve, however, due to the commencement of war and in 1940 was appointed as Operations Staff Officer to Vice-Admiral Sir Bertram Ramsay. Even so, Walker still had not been given a command, despite expertise in antisubmarine warfare that would no doubt be indispensable in the Battle of the Atlantic. During Walker's time in that role the Operation Dynamo evacuation took place from Dunkirk, in which the British Expeditionary Force (BEF) was evacuated from France. The evacuation was a success with over 330,000 British and French troops being rescued and brought back to England, or to Brittany. He was Mentioned in Despatches for his work during this operation.

Walker received his own command in October 1941, taking control of the 36th Escort Group, commanding from the  sloop . The escort group comprised two sloops (including Stork) and six corvettes and was based in Liverpool, the home of the Western Approaches Command. Initially his Group was primarily used to escort convoys to and from Gibraltar.

Walker's first chance to test his innovative methods against the U-boat menace came in December when his group escorted Convoy HG 76 (32 ships). During the journey five U-boats were sunk, four by Walker's group, including  which was depth-charged and rammed by Walker's own ship on 19 December. The Royal Navy's loss during the Battle for HG 76 was one escort carrier, formerly the German vessel Hannover; one destroyer, and two merchant ships. This is sometimes described as the first true Allied convoy victory in the Battle of the Atlantic. He was given the Distinguished Service Order (DSO) on 6 January 1942, "For daring, skill and determination while escorting to this country a valuable Convoy in the face of relentless attacks from the Enemy, during which three of their Submarines were sunk and two aircraft destroyed by our forces". Walker's group succeeded in sinking at least three more U-boats during his tenure as commander of the 36th Group. He was awarded the first Bar to his DSO in July 1942.

During 1942, Walker left the 36th Group and became Captain (D) Liverpool, granting him some time to recuperate. He finally returned to a ship command when he became commander of the 2nd Support Group in 1943, consisting of six sloops. The group was intended to act as reinforcement to convoys under attack, with the capacity to actively hunt and destroy U-boats, rather than be restricted to escorting convoys. Walker had suggested the innovative idea to the Commander-in-Chief Western Approaches Command, Sir Max Horton. The combination of an active hunting group and a charismatic, determined, and innovative anti-submarine specialist such as Walker proved to be a potent force. One eccentric aspect of his charismatic nature was the playing of the tune A Hunting We Will Go over the ship's Tannoy when returning to its base.

In June 1943 Walker's own ship Starling was responsible for the sinking of two U-boats. The first, was destroyed on 2 June by depth charges and gunfire, and the other, on 24 June by depth charges and ramming. Another U-boat, was sunk by his group on the same day. On 30 July, Walker's group encountered a group of three U-boats on the surface (two were vital type XIV replenishment boats known as "Milk Cows") while in the Bay of Biscay. He signalled the "General Chase" to his group and fired at them, causing damage that prevented them from diving.

Upon his return to Liverpool, Walker was informed that his son, Timothy Walker, had been killed when the submarine  was lost in early August 1943 in the Mediterranean Sea. On 14 September 1943, Walker was appointed as a Companion of the Order of the Bath (CB) "for leadership and daring in command of H.M.S. Starling in successful actions against Enemy submarines in the Atlantic."

In early 1944 Walker's group displayed its efficiency against U-boats by sinking six in one patrol. On 31 January 1944 Walker's group gained its first kill of the year when it sank . On 20 February 1944 one ship of Walker's group, was torpedoed and sank seven days later while being towed home. All of her crewmen were saved. They returned to their base at Liverpool to the thrilled jubilation of the city's inhabitants and the Admiralty. The First Lord of the Admiralty was present to greet Walker and his ships. Walker was promoted to captain and awarded a second bar to his DSO.

In March 1944 Walker's group provided part of the 32-ship escort force for an Arctic convoy of 49 merchant ships, codenamed Convoy JW 58. The powerful escort also included two escort carriers and two flotillas of fleet destroyers, as well as the U.S. Navy light cruiser  which was on its way to Russia as part of the Lend-Lease programme. The whole force was commanded by Rear-Admiral Frederick Dalrymple-Hamilton on the cruiser , who initially tried to direct Walkers ships into a tight screen, but soon allowed him to independently command the two support groups from Western Command. The groups returned with the 36-ship convoy RA 58, but despite intelligence of 16 U-boats in their path, no contacts were made due to adverse conditions affecting the ASDIC (sonar).

Walker's last duty was protecting the fleet from U-boats during the Normandy landings, the immense Allied invasion of France. This he did successfully for two weeks; no U-boats managed to get past Walker and his vessels, and many U-boats were sunk or damaged in the process. During this concerted effort Walker's dedication to his tasks was tremendous; he took no respite from his duties, which ultimately contributed to his death. He was awarded the third bar on his DSO on 13 June 1944, and was again Mentioned in Despatches on 20 June 1944.

Methods
One highly successful tactic employed by Walker was the creeping attack, in which two ships would work together to keep contact with a U–boat while attacking. A refinement of this was the barrage attack, in which three or more sloops in line to launch depth charges to saturate the area with depth charges in a manner similar to a rolling barrage by artillery in advance of an infantry attack. Walker was also adept at, once having contact with a U-boat, keeping it at depth below depth charge detonation range, until it needed to surface due to running out of air or battery, and then defeating it.

Successes
Walker was the most successful anti-submarine commander of the Second World War, being credited with 17 U boats destroyed, from various ships.

Death
Walker suffered a cerebral thrombosis on 7 July 1944, and he died two days later at the Naval Hospital at Seaforth, Merseyside, at the age of 48. His death was attributed to overwork and exhaustion.

His funeral service took place at the Liverpool Anglican Cathedral with full naval honours, being attended by about 1,000 people. A naval procession followed escorting the body through the streets of the city to the docks, where it was embarked aboard the destroyer , for a burial at sea. As Walker's Group had already steamed out for combat duty, most of the naval personnel who manned the funeral procession were from the Royal Canadian Navy.

A final honour bestowed upon Walker was a posthumous Mention in Despatches on 1 August 1944.

Legacy

In 1998 a statue by Liverpool sculptor Tom Murphy of Walker in a typical pose was unveiled at the Pier Head in Liverpool by the Duke of Edinburgh. Memorabilia associated with Walker include the ships's bell from HMS Starling which was given to Bootle Town Hall in October 1964.

Honours and awards

References

Further reading
 
 
 Axel Neistle  : German U-Boat Losses during World War II  (1998).

External links

 Walker, RN, BBC People's War
 Short biographies of Royal Navy (RN) Officers, 1939–1945
 Captain Walker RN

1896 births
1944 deaths
Military personnel from Plymouth, Devon
Burials at sea
Companions of the Distinguished Service Order
Companions of the Order of the Bath
Graduates of Britannia Royal Naval College
People educated at the Royal Naval College, Osborne
Royal Navy officers of World War I
Royal Navy officers of World War II
Deaths from cerebral thrombosis
Royal Navy personnel killed in World War II
Anti-submarine warfare